Mallory O'Brien is a CrossFit athlete. In 2022, at the age of 18, she came in second at the 2022 CrossFit Games, becoming the youngest ever person to podium. Earlier in the year, she was the youngest ever person to win the Crossfit Open, and in 2021 was named CrossFit's Rookie of the Year.

Early life
Mallory O'Brien is from Des Moines, Iowa, and was born to Joe and Nicole O'Brien. She has been athletic from a young age, and was a competitive gymnast since the age of 3, reaching level 6. She started CrossFit at the age of 10. In 2020, Mal was diagnosed with Lyme disease.

She joined HWPO in January 2022 to be trained by the former champion Mat Fraser.

Career
O'Brien started competing in the teen division of the CrossFit Games at the age of 14 starting in 2018 and finished 4th in her debut season. She also qualified for the 2019 CrossFit Games.

She did not compete in 2020 for health reasons.

At the 2021 CrossFit Games, O'Brien competed in the elite women division for the first time. She won Individual Event 4, and became the youngest-ever competitor to win an event at the Games. She eventually finished 7th overall and was named Rookie of the Year, thereby becoming the first athlete to win the accolade while still eligible for the teen divisions.

In 2022, O'Brien became the youngest person to win the CrossFit Open. At the 2022 CrossFit Games, O'Brien finished in second-place after six-time winner Tia-Clair Toomey, which made her the youngest-ever person to reach the podium at the CrossFit Games.

CrossFit Games results

References

External links
Mal O'Brien at CrossFit

CrossFit athletes
Living people

Year of birth uncertain
2004 births